Lakon  is an Oceanic language, spoken on the west coast of Gaua island in Vanuatu.

Names
The language name Lakon  refers originally to the area where it is spoken ‒ namely Lakona Bay, corresponding to the west coast of Gaua. The alternative name Lakona  is from the Mota language. These names are derived from a Proto-Torres-Banks form *laᵑgona, of unknown meaning.

Lakon had four dialects, named Qatareu (Qätärew ), Vure (Vurē ), Toglatareu, and Togla.

Phonology

Consonants
Lakon has 16 phonemic consonants. 

The glottal stop  only occurs before vowels in syllable-initial position. While non-phonemic, it is sometimes noted in the orthography, using a  mark.

Vowels
Lakon has 16 phonemic vowels. 
These include 8 short /i ɪ ɛ æ a ɔ ʊ u/ and 8 long vowels /iː ɪː ɛː æː aː ɔː ʊː uː/.

Historically, the phonemicisation of vowel length originates in the compensatory lengthening of short vowels when the alveolar trill  was lost syllable-finally.

Grammar
The system of personal pronouns in Lakon contrasts clusivity, and distinguishes four numbers (singular, dual, trial, plural).

Spatial reference in Lakon is based on a system of geocentric (absolute) directionals, which is typical of Oceanic languages.

References

Bibliography

 .

External links
 Portions of the Book of Common Prayer in Lakon from Project Canterbury
 A book of traditional stories, monolingual in Lakon language (site of linguist A. François)
 Detailed list and map of the Banks and Torres languages, showing range of Lakon.
 Audio recordings in the Lakon language, in open access, by A. François (source: Pangloss Collection).
 Paradisec has collections with Lakon language materials including Arthur Capell's fieldnotes (AC2) and Digitised microfilm images from Pacific Manuscripts Bureau (PAMBU).

Languages of Vanuatu
Banks–Torres languages
Torba Province
Vulnerable languages